Roman Yevgenyevich Romanov (born 28 March 2003) is a Russian football player. He plays for FC Forte Taganrog.

Club career
He made his debut in the Russian Premier League for FC Rostov on 19 June 2020 in a game against PFC Sochi. FC Rostov was forced to field their Under-18 squad in that game as their main squad was quarantined after 6 players tested positive for COVID-19. He scored a goal in the first minute of the game which eventually ended with the score of 10–1 for Sochi.

References

External links
 
 
 

2003 births
Living people
Russian footballers
Association football midfielders
FC Rostov players
Russian Premier League players